Stor-Svinören is a Swedish island belonging to the Piteå archipelago. The island is located off the coast of Nörd-Haraholmen. Lill-Svinören is located west of Stor-Svinören. The island has no shore connection and there are some summer houses on it.

References 

Islands of Sweden